The Promotion Marketing Association (PMA) is an advocacy group and trade association for the promotion and integrated marketing sector.

The PMA is headquartered in New York City with its affiliate, the PMA Educational Foundation, Inc. Its president is Bonnie J. Carlson. The past president, Claire Rosenzweig, is now president of the Better Business Bureau of New York.

Councils
It comprises a number of councils, including:

 Couponing
 Event Marketing
 Government/Law
 Shopper Marketing
 Interactive Promotions
 Entertainment Marketing
 Product Sampling & Demonstration

External links

Advertising organizations
Organizations established in 1911
Trade associations based in the United States
Organizations based in New York City
1911 establishments in New York (state)